Milan Marković is a Serbian politician.

Milan Marković may also refer to:

Milan Marković (volleyball)
Milan Marković (footballer, born 1979)
Milan Marković (basketball)
Milan Markovič (entertainer)